John Asman is an American sound engineer. He won four Primetime Emmy Awards and was nominated for seventeen more in the category Outstanding Sound Mixing. In 1994, Asman was awarded the Academy Award for Technical Achievement.

References

External links 

Living people
Place of birth missing (living people)
Year of birth missing (living people)
American audio engineers
20th-century American engineers
21st-century American engineers
Primetime Emmy Award winners
Academy Award for Technical Achievement winners